Isabella Hammad is a British-Palestinian author. She was born in London, England and lives in Brooklyn New York, US. She studied at Oxford University and Harvard University.

Awards and honors
 2018, Plimpton Prize for Fiction
 2019, O. Henry Prize for short story
 2019, National Book Award, National Book Foundation, "5 Under 35" honoree
 2019, Palestine Book Award 
 2020, Sue Kaufman Prize, American Academy of Arts and Letters
 2020, Betty Trask Award, Society of Authors in the UK
 2020, Lannan Foundation Literary Fellowship

Books
The Parisian (Jonathan Cape, 2019)

References

Living people
Year of birth missing (living people)
21st-century British women writers
21st-century English writers
Palestinian novelists
Writers from London
English short story writers
British women short story writers
Alumni of the University of Oxford
Harvard University alumni